Tricolia indica is a species of small sea snail with calcareous opercula, a marine gastropod mollusk in the family Phasianellidae, the pheasant snails.

Distribution

References

External links
 To World Register of Marine Species

Phasianellidae
Gastropods described in 1940